Sapa is an unincorporated community in Webster County, in the U.S. state of Mississippi.

History
Sapa was founded in the 1880s, when the railroad was extended to that point.  A post office was established at Sapa in 1889, and remained in operation until 1935.  The name "Sapa" may be derived from the Choctaw meaning "snake", although folk etymology holds the name is derived from a question, i.e. "Say, Pa! What are they going to name this place?"

References

Unincorporated communities in Mississippi
Unincorporated communities in Webster County, Mississippi
Mississippi placenames of Native American origin